Sealdah–Ballia Express (13105/13106) is a normal Express-type train of Indian Railways linking the city of Kolkata with Ballia district of Uttar Pradesh.

Stopage
This is a long-distance running express and covers its journey within a day. This train covers 669 kilometers at a speed of 40 km/h and through its journey it passes through important stations like:
Sealdah
Naihati
Bandel
Burdwan
Durgapur
Asansol
Jhajha
Gidhaur
Jamui
Kiul
Barauni
Hajipur
Sonpur
Chhapra etc.

Facility
This train features a 2AC, a 3AC, a HA-1 AC, Sleeper Class and general sitting type of coaches. All the classes except general class require prior reservation. Tatkal scheme is available in this train, whereas pantry car facility is unavailable. This train is very popular among travelers; as a result of this people have to book their tickets at least four months in advance and even in some cases the Tatkal tickets are unavailable due to their high demand. This is one of the most important train in this route after Purvanchal Express via Mau.

Train detail

Traction
It is now hauled by Electric Loco Shed, Howrah based WAP 4 throughout the entire journey.

See also
Eastern Railway zone
Sealdah
Ballia

References

 
 

Transport in Kolkata
Express trains in India
Rail transport in West Bengal
Rail transport in Uttar Pradesh
Rail transport in Jharkhand
Rail transport in Bihar
Ballia